Greystone Castle is a small Tudor style cottage in the Newlands Manor section of Reno, Nevada, USA. It was added to the National Register of Historic Places as an example of its architectural style as well as its ties into Reno's history as a migratory divorce town. Starting with the William E. Corey divorce, Reno became known for its much quicker and simpler divorce laws, the only requirement being that the individuals had to stay in town for six months to achieve residency. Greystone Castle is the type of smaller upscale housing that divorcing individuals used during their waiting period.

References

Houses on the National Register of Historic Places in Nevada
Tudor Revival architecture in Nevada
Houses completed in 1930
Houses in Reno, Nevada
National Register of Historic Places in Reno, Nevada